Christian M'Pumbu (born June 2, 1977) is a French-Congolese professional mixed martial artist. He was the inaugural Bellator Light Heavyweight Champion.

Background
M'Pumbu was born in Kinshasa, Zaire (now known as the Democratic Republic of the Congo). He currently resides in France.

Mixed martial arts career

M'Pumbu made his professional mixed martial arts (MMA) debut in 2004.  He has fought primarily in Europe for various promotions including KSW and M-1 Global.  He is currently a member of Team France in M-1 Mixfight.

Before his debut in the United States, M'Pumbu amassed a record of 15 wins, 3 losses and 1 draw.  A notable win from this period is over Ultimate Fighting Championship heavyweight contender Stefan Struve.

Bellator Fighting Championships
M'Pumbu made his U.S. MMA debut on March 26, 2011 at Bellator 38.  He faced Chris Davis in the opening round of the Light Heavyweight tournament and won the fight via TKO in the third round. In the semi-finals he defeated Tim Carpenter via TKO in the first round. M'Pumbu would go on to defeat Rich Hale via TKO in the third round at the finals of the season 4 tournament, becoming the inaugural Bellator Light Heavyweight champion. He was unofficially dubbed the first African born mixed martial artist to hold a title in a major MMA organization.

On October 22, 2011 at Bellator 55, M'Pumbu lost a non-title fight against Travis Wiuff via unanimous decision. On February 28, 2013, at Bellator 91 M'Pumbu faced Bellator 2012 Summer Series Light Heavyweight tournament winner Attila Vegh in his first title defense and lost via unanimous decision.

On September 13, 2013, at Bellator 99, M'Pumbu was expected to face UFC veteran Vladimir Matyushenko. M'Pumbu pulled out of the fight with a hand injury and was replaced with Houston Alexander.

M'Pumbu faced Quinton Jackson in the opening round of Bellator's Season 10 Light Heavyweight tournament in the main event at Bellator 110 on February 28, 2014. He lost the fight via knockout in the first round, the first knockout loss of his career.

M'Pumbu made his Middleweight debut against Kendall Grove on October 3, 2014 at Bellator 127. He lost the fight via submission in the second round.

Championships and accomplishments
Bellator Fighting Championships
Bellator Light Heavyweight World Championship (One time; First)
Bellator Season 4 Light Heavyweight Tournament Winner
Union of Peresvit
Star of Peresvit Openweight Tournament Winner
Fire of Persevit Openweight Tournament Winner

Mixed martial arts record

|-
|Loss
|align=center|21–11–1
|Stanislav Klybik
|KO (head kick)
|League S-70 - Plotforma S-70: 2018
|
|align=center| 1
|align=center| 4:45
|Sochi, Russia
|
|-
|Loss
|align=center|21–10–1
|Mikhail Ragozin
|Decision (unanimous)
|RCC 2: Battles in the Cage
|
|align=center| 3
|align=center| 5:00
|Chelyabinsk, Russia
|
|-
|Loss
|align=center|21–9–1
|Ivan Shtyrkov
|Decision (unanimous)
|RCC 1: Battles in the Cage
|
|align=center| 3
|align=center| 5:00
|Yekaterinburg, Russia
|
|-
| Win
|align=center|21–8–1
|Sergio Souza
|DQ (punches after stoppage)
|Magnum Fighting Championship 1
|
|align=center| 1
|align=center| 0:40
| Rome, Italy
|
|-
| Win
| align=center| 20–8–1
| Sebastien Huot Marchand
| TKO (arm injury)
| ADW: Road to Abu Dhabi 3
| 
| align=center| 2
| align=center| 2:12
| Bangkok, Thailand
|
|-
| Loss
| align=center| 19–8–1
| Denis Stojnic
| TKO (punches)
| HIT Fighting Championship 2
| 
| align=center| 2
| align=center| 1:36
| Zurich, Switzerland
| 
|-
| Win
| align=center| 19–7–1
| Ramis Teregulov
| KO (punch)
| World Warriors Fighting Championship: CE 4
| 
| align=center| 2
| align=center| 3:37
| Paris, France
|
|-
| Loss
| align=center| 18–7–1
| Kendall Grove
| Submission (rear-naked choke)
| Bellator 127
| 
| align=center| 2
| align=center| 4:14
| Temecula, California, United States
| 
|-
| Loss
| align=center| 18–6–1
| Quinton Jackson
| KO (punches)
| Bellator 110
| 
| align=center| 1 
| align=center| 4:34
| Uncasville, Connecticut, United States
| 
|-
| Loss
| align=center| 18–5–1
| Attila Végh
| Decision (unanimous)
| Bellator 91
| 
| align=center| 5
| align=center| 5:00
| Rio Rancho, New Mexico, United States
| 
|-
| Loss
| align=center| 18–4–1
| Travis Wiuff
| Decision (unanimous)
| Bellator 55
| 
| align=center| 3
| align=center| 5:00
| Yuma, Arizona, United States
| 
|-
| Win
| align=center| 18–3–1
| Rich Hale
| TKO (punches)
| Bellator 45
| 
| align=center| 3
| align=center| 4:17
| Lake Charles, Louisiana, United States
| 
|-
| Win
| align=center| 17–3–1
| Tim Carpenter
| TKO (punches)
| Bellator 42
| 
| align=center| 1
| align=center| 2:08
| Concho, Oklahoma, United States
| 
|-
| Win
| align=center| 16–3–1
| Chris Davis
| TKO (punches)
| Bellator 38
| 
| align=center| 3
| align=center| 3:34
| Tunica, Mississippi, United States
| 
|-
| Loss
| align=center| 15–3–1
| Yoshiyuki Nakanishi
| Decision (split)
| Deep: 47 Impact
| 
| align=center| 2
| align=center| 5:00
| Tokyo, Japan
| 
|-
| Win
| align=center| 15–2–1
| Yuji Sakuragi
| TKO (punches)
| Deep: 46 Impact
| 
| align=center| 1
| align=center| 2:29
| Tokyo, Japan
| 
|-
| Win
| align=center| 14–2–1
| Hideto Tatsumi
| TKO (punches)
| M-1 Challenge 18: Netherlands Day One
| 
| align=center| 2
| align=center| 4:53
| Hilversum, Netherlands
| 
|-
| Win
| align=center| 13–2–1
| Krzysztof Kulak
| Decision (unanimous)
| Multi Boxes: 1er Gala International
| 
| align=center| 2
| align=center| 5:00
| Paris, France
| 
|-
| Win
| align=center| 12–2–1
| Enoc Solves Torres
| Submission (armbar)
| M-1 Challenge 14: Japan
| 
| align=center| 1
| align=center| 4:59
| Tokyo, Japan
| 
|-
| Draw
| align=center| 11–2–1
| Leonardo Nascimento Lucio
| Draw
| 100% fight 1
| 
| align=center| 3
| align=center| 5:00
| Paris, France
| 
|-
| Win
| align=center| 11–2
| Marcus Vanttinen
| Submission (rear-naked choke)
| M-1 Challenge 10: Finland
| 
| align=center| 1
| align=center| 2:15
| Helsinki, Finland
| 
|-
| Loss
| align=center| 10–2
| Jan Błachowicz
| Submission (armbar)
| KSW Extra
| 
| align=center| 2
| align=center| 3:12
| Dąbrowa Górnicza, Poland
| 
|-
| Win
| align=center| 10–1
| Barry Guerin
| TKO (punches)
| M-1 Challenge 5: Japan
| 
| align=center| 1
| align=center| 0:32
| Tokyo, Japan
| 
|-
| Loss
| align=center| 9–1
| Fabio Fernandes
| Decision (unanimous)
| Fite Selektor
| 
| align=center| 2
| align=center| 5:00
| Dubai City, United Arab Emirates
| 
|-
| Win
| align=center| 9–0
| Denis Sobolev
| Submission (rear-naked choke)
| Star of Peresvit
| 
| align=center| 1
| align=center| 1:20
| Kyiv, Ukraine
| 
|-
| Win
| align=center| 8–0
| Stefan Struve
| Submission (D'arce choke)
| Star of Peresvit
| 
| align=center| 1
| align=center| 2:05
| Kyiv, Ukraine
| 
|-
| Win
| align=center| 7–0
| Aleksey Gonchar
| Decision
| Star of Peresvit
| 
| align=center| 2
| align=center| 5:00
| Kyiv, Ukraine
| 
|-
| Win
| align=center| 6–0
| Sergey Mukhamedshin
| Submission (guillotine choke)
| M-1 MFC: International Mix Fight
| 
| align=center| 1
| align=center| 1:25
| St. Petersburg, Russia
| 
|-
| Win
| align=center| 5–0
| Vladimir Shemarov
| Decision
| Fire of Persevit
| 
| align=center| 2
| align=center| 5:00
| Kyiv, Ukraine
| 
|-
| Win
| align=center| 4–0
| Valdas Pocevicius
| Submission (rear-naked choke)
| Fire of Persevit
| 
| align=center| 1
| align=center| 1:48
| Kyiv, Ukraine
| 
|-
| Win
| align=center| 3–0
| Denis Bublov
| Submission (rear-naked choke)
| Fire of Persevit
| 
| align=center| 1
| align=center| 2:20
| Kyiv, Ukraine
| 
|-
| Win
| align=center| 2–0
| Dramane Traore
| Submission (rear-naked choke)
| Xtreme Gladiators 2
| 
| align=center| 2
| align=center| 2:40
| Paris, France
| 
|-
| Win
| align=center| 1–0
| Kuljit Degun
| KO (punches)
| UKMMAC 7: Rage & Fury
| 
| align=center| 1
| align=center| 0:32
| Essex, England
|

External links

References

Living people
1977 births
Democratic Republic of the Congo male mixed martial artists
French mixed martial artists of Black African descent
Light heavyweight mixed martial artists
Democratic Republic of the Congo male judoka
Democratic Republic of the Congo savateurs
Democratic Republic of the Congo practitioners of Brazilian jiu-jitsu
French male judoka
French savateurs
French practitioners of Brazilian jiu-jitsu
Sportspeople from Kinshasa
Sportspeople from Grand Est
Democratic Republic of the Congo emigrants to France
Bellator MMA champions
French male mixed martial artists
Mixed martial artists utilizing savate
Mixed martial artists utilizing judo
Mixed martial artists utilizing Brazilian jiu-jitsu